Jacob Birger Natvig (6 December 1934 – 2 April 2021) was a Norwegian physician, a pioneer in the field of immunology in Norway.

Career
Born in Oslo, Natvig graduated as cand.med. in 1959, and as dr.med. in 1966. He worked as physician at the Oslo University Hospital, Rikshospitalet, from 1967 to 1977, and was then appointed director of the hospital from 1978 to 1986. From 1986 to 2004 he was professor of immunology at the University of Oslo.

Natvig was a member of the Norwegian Academy of Science and Letters from 1978. Natvig served as president of the International Union of Immunological Societies from 1989 to 1992, and he was founder and chairman of the board of the foundation Nasjonalt medisinsk museum. He was decorated Knight, First Class of the Order of St. Olav in 2009, for his contribution to medical research.

He died in Oslo on 2 April 2021.

Selected works
 Medisinsk immunologi (with Morten Harboe; first edition 1975).

References

1934 births
2021 deaths
20th-century Norwegian physicians
21st-century Norwegian physicians
Norwegian immunologists
Oslo University Hospital people
Academic staff of the University of Oslo
Norwegian medical historians
Order of Saint Olav
Members of the Norwegian Academy of Science and Letters